The Maltese Chess Championship is the yearly chess championship organised by the Malta Chess Federation in Malta which determines the national champion. Initially it consisted of an Open Championship.

Now the National championships also include the Junior Championships, the Rapid Championships and the Blitz Championships.

The current open National Champion is David Cilia Vincenti.  Jack Mizzi holds the other 3 National titles: National Junior Champion, National Rapid Champion and National Blitz Champion.

Malta Open Championships

The first recorded open championship was held in 1923 and was won by Oscar Serracino-Inglott. Harry Camilleri won the championship a record eighteen times, first in 1965 and last in 2005, at the age of 72.

The current Malta Open Chess Champion is David Cilia Vincenti.

Candidates phase
To qualify for the Final phase of the Open Championship a player needs to have either placed first or second in the previous year or have placed in the top N of the Candidates phase of that year.  N is determined by the number of participants.

Preliminaries Phase
To qualify for the Candidates, a player must have reached an established Elo rating, currently 1700, or have placed in the top N of the Preliminaries.  The youngest player to have won the Preliminaries in Malta is Jack Mizzi.

Past Winners of Final Stage

{| class="sortable wikitable"
! # !! Year !! Winner
|-
|	1	||	1923	||	
|-
|	2	||	1925	||	
|-
|	3	||	1926	||	
|-
|	4	||	1927	||	
|-
|	5	||	1928	||	
|-
|	6	||	1930	||	
|-
|	7	||	1934	||	
|-
|	8	||	1935	||	
|-
|	9	||	1936	||	
|-
|	10	||	1937	||	
|-
|	11	||	1938	||	
|-
|	12	||	1939	||	
|-
|	13	||	1940	||	
|-
|	14	||	1946	||	
|-
|	15	||	1948	||	
|-
|	16	||	1949	||	
|-
|	17	||	1950	||	
|-
|	18	||	1953	||	
|-
|	19	||	1954	||	
|-
|	20	||	1955	||	
|-
|	21	||	1956	||	
|-
|	22	||	1957	||	
|-
|	23	||	1958	||	
|-
|	24	||	1959	||	
|-
|	25	||	1960	||	
|-
|	26	||	1961	||	
|-
|	27	||	1962	||	
|-
|	28	||	1963	||	
|-
|	29	||	1964	||	
|-
|	30	||	1965	||	
|-
|	31	||	1966	||	
|-
|	32	||	1967	||	
|-
|	33	||	1968	||	
|-
|	34	||	1969	||	
|-
|	35	||	1970	||	
|-
|	36	||	1971	||	
|-
|	37	||	1972	||	
|-
|	38	||	1973	||	
|-
|	39	||	1974	||	
|-
|	40	||	1975	||	
|-
|	41	||	1976	||	
|-
|	42	||	1977	||	
|-
|	43	||	1978	||	
|-
|	44	||	1979	||	
|-
|	45	||	1980	||	
|-
|	46	||	1981	||	  
|-
|	47	||	1982	||	
|-
|	48	||	1983	||	
|-
|	49	||	1984	||	
|-
|	50	||	1985	||	
|-
|	51	||	1986	||	
|-
|	52	||	1987	||	
|-
|	53	||	1988	||	
|-
|	54	||	1989	||	
|-
|	55	||	1990	||	
|-
|	56	||	1991	||	
|-
|	57	||	1992	||	
|-
|	58	||	1993	||	
|-
|	59	||	1994	||	
|-
|	60	||	1995	||	
|-
|	61	||	1996	||	
|-
|	62	||	1997	||	
|-
|	63	||	1998	||	
|-
|	64	||	1999	||	
|-
|	65	||	2000	||	
|-
|	66	||	2001	||	
|-
|	67	||	2002	||	
|-
|	68	||	2003	||	
|-
|	69	||	2004	||	
|-
|	70	||	2005	||	
|-
|	71	||	2006	||	
|-
|	72	||	2007	||	
|-
|	73	||	2008	||	
|-
|	74	||	2009	||	
|-
|	75	||	2010	||	
|-
|	76	||	2011	||	
|-
|	77	||	2012	||	
|-
|	78	||	2013	||	
|-
|	79	||	2014	||	
|-
|	80	||	2015	||	
|-
|	81	||	2016	||	
|-
|	82	||	2017	||	
|-
|	83	||	2018	||	
|-
|	84	||	2019	||	
|-
|	85	||	2020	||	
|-
|	86	||	2021	||	
|-
|	87	||	2022	||	
|}

Malta Rapid Championships

Since 2017, the Malta Chess Federation started organising the Malta National Rapid Championship.

In 2021 an online Rapid Gran Prix was held and this was won by Jack Mizzi. The 2022 Malta Rapid champion was Jack Mizzi.

{| class="sortable wikitable"
! # !! Year !! Winner
|-
|	1	||	2017	||	
|-
|	2	||	2018	||	 
|-
|	3	||	2019	||	 
|-
|	4	||	2021	||	Jack Mizzi
|-
|	5	||	2022	||	
|}

Malta Blitz Championships

Since 2017, the Malta Chess Federation started organising the Malta National Blitz Championship.

In 2021, an online Blitz Gran Prix was held and this was won by Jack Mizzi. The 2022 Malta Blitz champion was Jack Mizzi.

{| class="sortable wikitable"
! # !! Year !! Winner
|-
|	1	||	2017	||	
|-
|	2	||	2018	||	 
|-
|	3	||	2019	||	
|-
|	3	||	2021	||	
|-
|	4	||	2022	||	
|}

Malta Junior championships

The first Malta Junior Championship was held in 1946 but the Malta Chess Federation only has records since 1987.

The current Malta junior champion is Jack Mizzi.

{| class="sortable wikitable"
! # !! Year !! Winner
|-
|	1	||	1987	||	Duncan Vella
|-
|	2	||	1988	||	Joseph Stafrace
|-
|	3	||	1989	||	Joseph Stafrace
|-
|	4	||	1990	||	Joseph Stafrace
|-
|	5	||	1991	||	Duncan Vella
|-
|	6	||	1992	||Timothy Mifsud
|-
|	7	||	1993	||Timothy Mifsud
|-
|	8	||	1994	||Timothy Mifsud
|-
|	9	||	1995	||Peter Pullicino
|-
|	10	||	1996	||David Cilia Vincenti
|-
|	11	||	1997	||Colin Pace
|-
|	12	||	1998	||Timothy Mifsud
|-
|	13	||	1999	||Colin Pace
|-
|	14	||	2000	||Daniel Abela
|-
|	15	||	2001	||Daniel Abela
|-
|	16	||	2002	||Daniel Abela
|-
|	17	||	2003	||Charles Sinn
|-
|	18	||	2004	||Mark Cardona
|-
|	19	||	2005	||Mark Cardona
|-
|	20	||	2006	||Mark Cardona
|-
|	21	||	2007	||Robert Zerafa
|-
|	22	||	2008	||Robert Zerafa
|-
|	23	||	2009	||Robert Zerafa
|-
|	24	||	2010	||Andre Xuereb
|-
|	25	||	2011	||Jake Darmanin
|-
|	26	||	2012	||Jake Darmanin
|-
|	27	||	2013	||Jake Darmanin
|-
|	28	||	2014	||Jake Darmanin
|-
|	29	||	2015	||Jurgen Grima
|-
|	30	||	2016	||	Jamie Farrugia
|-
|	31	||	2017	||	Steve Mizzi
|-
|	32	||	2018	||	Matthew Fleri
|-
|	33	||	2019	||	Cosmin Alexa
|-
|	34	||	2021	||	Matthew Fleri
|-
|	35	||	2022	||	Jack Mizzi
|-
|	36	||	2023	||	Jack Mizzi
|}

References

Other Links

On the 18th victory of Harry Camilleri The Malta Independent

Chess national championships
Championship